During the 1962–63 English football season, Everton F.C. competed in the Football League First Division.

Final league table

P = Matches played; W = Matches won; D = Matches drawn; L = Matches lost; F = Goals for; A = Goals against; GA = Goal average; GD = Goal difference; Pts = Points

Results

Football League First Division

FA Cup

Inter-Cities Fairs Cup

Squad

References

1962-63
Everton F.C. season
English football championship-winning seasons